Căpuşu Mare is a commune in Cluj County, Transylvania, Romania, located 27 kilometers west of the city of Cluj-Napoca. It is composed of nine villages: Agârbiciu (Egerbegy), Bălcești (Balkujtelep), Căpușu Mare, Căpușu Mic (Magyarkiskapus), Dângău Mare (Bánffydongó), Dângău Mic (Gyerőfidongó), Dumbrava (Gyerővásárhely), Păniceni (Gyerőfalva) and Straja (Gesztrágy).

Economy
The main industry is an iron ore extraction facility. It is a tourist destination, with many new motels built in recent years.

Demographics
According to the 2011 census, Romanians made up 55.2% of the population, Hungarians made up 37.3% and Roma made up 5.6%.

References

Communes in Cluj County
Localities in Transylvania